Hartsville Armory is a historic National Guard armory located at Hartsville, Darlington County, South Carolina.

History
The armory was built in 1939–1940, by the Works Progress Administration and designed by architect Heyward S. Singley (1902–1959) of Columbia, South Carolina. It is a two-story, 21 bay wide, rectangular brick Art Moderne style building.  It has a flat roof behind stepped and overlaid parapets with a rat-tooth corbeled course and cast stone coping.

It was listed on the National Register of Historic Places in 1994.

References

Works Progress Administration in South Carolina
Armories on the National Register of Historic Places in South Carolina
Moderne architecture in South Carolina
Government buildings completed in 1940
Buildings and structures in Hartsville, South Carolina
National Register of Historic Places in Darlington County, South Carolina